The siege of Santa Maura in March and April 1810 was fought between the British and the French troops on the island of Lefkada (then known as Santa Maura). Santa Maura had belonged to the First French Empire since 1807, and was garrisoned by a mixed force of French regulars and men of the locally raised, Greco-Albanian Albanian Regiment. The British troops that landed on the island were also supported by Greek and Corsican volunteer troops. Mistrust of the Greco-Albanian troops by the French command, and the presence of Greeks in the British force, resulted in the defection of the Albanian Regiment's men to the British, hastening the surrender of the island.

Background
The island of Santa Maura, along with the other Ionian Islands, fell under French rule in 1807, after the Treaty of Tilsit.
In October 1809, the British attacked and captured the islands of Zakynthos (Zante), Cephalonia, Kythira (Cerigo), and Ithaca. These islands were defended by small garrisons, with a few dozen regular French soldiers and larger numbers of men of the locally raised Albanian Regiment (400 on Zakynthos, 145 on Cephalonia, 46 on Ithaca, and 27 on Kythira) on each island. These forces were completely inadequate to offer anything but a token resistance; the captured men were transferred to Italy as prisoners of war, but more than a few of the Albanian Regiment's men—up to about half in Zakynthos—simply scattered into the countryside and resumed their traditional guerrilla habits. Most of these escapees, as well as those taken prisoner, were soon induced to enter British service in what eventually became the 1st Regiment Greek Light Infantry. Over 70% of the Albanian Regiment's men on the four islands switched to the British, including most of the officers.

British landing on Santa Maura
Before the landing of the main force, the British sent Lt. Colonel Hudson Lowe along with two Greek chieftains, Theodoros Kolokotronis and Konstantis Petmezas, to scout the situation on the island. Kolokotronis made contact with the local Greco-Albanian troops, and urged them to surrender, but the latter refused, citing their oath to fight with the French. After that, the British landed their main force, some 4,000 strong, comprising British and Sicilian troops as well as Greek and Corsican (Royal Corsican Rangers)) volunteer detachments. The initial fighting was hard, but the British forces managed to overrun the French defences, capturing a number of gun batteries. In these battles, the Greeks under Kolokotronis and Richard Church distinguished themselves, and Church was wounded.

After these setbacks, the French commander, General Camus, retired with his French troops to the Castle of Santa Maura. Distrustful of the loyalties of the Albanian Regiment, he left its men outside the fortress. This decision not only left the lightly equipped men of the Albanian Regiment exposed to the elements, but Camus also refused to give shelter to their families in the fortress. As a result, the entire Albanian Regiment detachment of 823 men, apart from 13 men the French held as hostages, defected to the British. The British then proceeded to besiege the fortress, subjecting it to heavy bombardment, until the fortress surrendered.

References

Sources
 
 
 

Sieges of the Napoleonic Wars
Sieges involving the United Kingdom
Sieges involving France
Conflicts in 1810
March 1810 events
April 1810 events
1810 in the Ottoman Empire
19th century in Greece
Lefkada
French rule in the Ionian Islands (1807–1814)